Loebl Schlossman & Hackl is an American architecture firm based in Chicago, Illinois.

Founded in 1925 and known by various names through the years, the firm is responsible for the design of several major Chicago landmarks including the 1975 Water Tower Place and the 1990 Two Prudential Plaza.

History 

The firm's first major project was the Temple Sholom at 3480 N. Lake Shore Drive.  Armour Institute students Jerrold Loebl (1899-1978) and Norman J. Schlossman (1901-1990) largely developed the design while in school.  With a third architect John DeMuth, the young team was named as associate architects for the project, behind leads Coolidge and Hodgdon.

In the war years Loebl and Schlossman concentrated on war-related public housing projects on government contracts.  This included some 500 units in Seymour, Indiana and Rosiclaire, Illinois.  Further projects for the Chicago Housing Authority included the West Chesterfield Homes in 1944, Wentworth Gardens in 1946, and the 800 units in mid-rise, six-story, and nine-story residential towers on the 16 acres of the south-side Dearborn Homes in 1950.

The firm expanded with the addition of Richard M. Bennett (1907-1996), who had been chairman of the Yale Architecture Department, in 1947.  Bennett took the lead in the site plan and the architectural components of the suburban planned community of Park Forest, Illinois, which occupied the firm for years.  The town's innovative 1949 Park Forest Plaza shopping center developed into another sideline for the firm:  a genre of rambling, cleverly landscaped, village-like outdoor malls.  These include Old Orchard Shopping Center in Skokie, Illinois in 1956, and the 1962 Oakbrook Center in Oak Brook.

Designer Edward D. Dart joined in 1965 and triggered another wave of ambitious projects.  Bennett left in 1974 to teach at the Harvard Graduate School of Design; Dart's career hadn't peaked when he died of an aneurysm in July 1975.

The firm continues in business as of 2017.  It has operated as:
 Loebl and Schlossman (1925)
 Loebl, Schlossman and DeMuth (1926-c.1933)
 Loebl and Schlossman (c.1933-1946)
 Loebl, Schlossman and Bennett (1947-1965)
 Loebl, Schlossman, Bennett and Dart (1965-1975)
 Loebl Schlossman & Hackl (1976- )

Work 

All structures are in Chicago unless otherwise noted:

 Temple Sholom at 3480 N. Lake Shore Drive, 1928
 complete design for the planned community of Park Forest, Illinois, 1947
 Dearborn Homes, 1949-50
 Park Forest Plaza, Park Forest, Illinois, 1949
 Temple Beth-El, with architectural sculpture by Mitzi Cunliffe, South Bend, Indiana, 1950
 West Suburban Temple Har Zion, with architectural sculpture by Milton Horn, River Forest, Illinois, 1950
 twin residential towers at 1350 Lake Shore Drive, the former location of the Palmer Mansion, 1951
 Old Orchard Shopping Center, with landscape architect Lawrence Halprin, Skokie, Illinois, 1956
 Woodlands Academy of the Sacred Heart, Lake Forest, Illinois, 1961
 Oakbrook Center, also with Halprin, Oak Brook, Illinois, 1962
 Winton Place residential high-rise, Lakewood, Ohio, 1963
 associate architects for the Richard J. Daley Center, 1965
 River Oaks Center, Calumet City, Illinois, 1966
 Norris University Center, Northwestern University, Evanston, Illinois, 1971
 Water Tower Place, the tallest reinforced concrete building in the world until 1990, 1975
 Pick-Staiger Concert Hall, Evanston, 1975
 Mary and Leigh Block Museum of Art, Evanston, 1980
 Two Prudential Plaza, 1990
 Emil and Patricia Jones Convocation Center, 2007
 renovation of The Palmer House Hilton, 2007-2009
 Wentz Concert Hall and Fine Arts Center, North Central College, Naperville, 2008

References 

Architecture firms based in Chicago
Architects from Illinois